The discography of pureNRG, a Christian pop group, consists of four studio albums, one remix album and a compilation album. They have also released three DVDs and four music videos.

Albums

Studio albums

Compilation albums

Christmas albums

Remix albums

Chart history

 Note: — means that the album did not make the chart.

DVDs

Music videos

References

External links
 Official website

Discographies of American artists
Pop music group discographies
Christian music discographies